Alejandro "Alex" Alcalá Solorio (born 20 October 2005) is a professional footballer who plays as a midfielder for LA Galaxy II.

Club career
Born in Stockton, California, Alcalá started his career with local side Stockton TLJ FC Rebels. He spent time training with Manchester City, Barcelona and Pachuca before joining the LA Galaxy academy in 2020. He signed professional terms with the Galaxy in February 2021.

In July 2021, it was announced that English side Manchester City have a pre-arrangement with La Galaxy to have first refusal to Alcalá's buyout clause once he turns 18.

In July 2022, despite having not yet made his debut for LA Galaxy II, he was named to the MLS Next Pro All-Star XI for 2022.

International career
Eligible to represent both Mexico and the United States at international level, Alcalá has been capped by Mexico at various youth level.

Style of play
A skilful and fast midfielder, Alcalá models his play style on Brazilian legend Ronaldinho, and states that he admires the playing style of Jesús Manuel Corona. He has been referred to as the "Mexican Messi", due to his stature and playing style being similar to that of Argentine legend Lionel Messi. However, Alcalá says that he does not like this comparison, and wants to make his own impact on the game.

References

2005 births
Living people
Sportspeople from Stockton, California
Soccer players from California
American sportspeople of Mexican descent
American soccer players
Mexican footballers
Mexico youth international footballers
Association football midfielders
LA Galaxy players